Born Again is the seventh studio album by British singer Mica Paris, released on 1 June 2009.

Track listing

Personnel
Adapted from AllMusic.
Dick Beetham – mastering
Matt Furmidge – mixing
Cliff Masterson – string arrangements
Paul Meehan – producer, programming
Pino Palladino – bass
Mica Paris – primary artist, backing vocals
Adam Phillips – guitar
Brian Rawling – producer
Mark Read – piano

References

External links
Born Again at Discogs

2009 albums
Mica Paris albums
Albums produced by Brian Rawling